Pogodno is a municipal neighbourhood of the city of Szczecin, Poland situated on the left bank of Oder river, west of the Szczecin Old Town, and Middle Town. As of January 2011 it had a population of 25,500.

Before 1945 when Szczecin (Stettin) was a part of Germany, the German name of this suburb was Stettin-Braunsfelde.

References

External links

 http://www.pogodno.szczecin.pl

Pogodno